Central YMCA may refer to:

United States
 Shih Yu-Lang Central YMCA located at 220 Golden Gate Avenue in San Francisco, California
Downtown Denver Central YMCA and Annex, Denver, Colorado, listed on the NRHP in Denver, Colorado
 Central YMCA (Cleveland, Ohio), listed on the NRHP in Ohio
 Central YMCA (Toledo, Ohio), listed on the NRHP in Ohio
 Central YMCA (Association Building), now known as 19 South LaSalle Street in Chicago

See also
 YMCA (disambiguation)